The Domon Group, or Domon Research Group, is an interdisciplinary research group founded by former IBM researcher Eduard Domon in 1973. The group is organized in a loose affiliation of scientists, artists, and activists in laboratories and studios around the world. The Domon Group's research is wide-ranging, but is generally concerned with issues in artificial intelligence, information theory, self-organizing systems and language.

The distributed structure of the group has helped maintain the relative anonymity of members, while providing support and community to researchers working at the fringes of established fields. While there is no available master list of members, former members are believed to include Shawn Brixey of DXARTS at University of Washington, Jacque Servin  of the Yes Men, and the model and philosopher Lorianna Tuck. It has also been suggested that Domon Group members have a relatively strong presence in the research department of Google.

References

Working groups